The second cabinet of Theodor Rosetti was the government of Romania from 12 November 1888 to 22 March 1889.

Ministers
The ministers of the cabinet were as follows:

President of the Council of Ministers:
Theodor Rosetti (12 November 1888 - 22 March 1889)
Minister of the Interior: 
Alexandru B. Știrbei (12 November 1888 - 22 March 1889)
Minister of Foreign Affairs: 
Petre P. Carp (12 November 1888 - 22 March 1889)
Minister of Finance:
Menelas Ghermani (12 November 1888 - 22 March 1889)
Minister of Justice:
George Vernescu (12 November 1888 - 22 March 1889)
Minister of War:
Gen. George Manu (12 November 1888 - 22 March 1889)
Minister of Religious Affairs and Public Instruction:
Titu Maiorescu (12 November 1888 - 22 March 1889)
Minister of Public Works:
Alexandru Marghiloman (12 November 1888 - 22 March 1889)
Minister of Agriculture, Trade, Industry and Commerce:
Alexandru N. Lahovari (12 November 1888 - 22 March 1889)

References

Cabinets of Romania
Cabinets established in 1888
Cabinets disestablished in 1889
1888 establishments in Romania
1889 disestablishments in Romania